Felton South is a rural locality in the Toowoomba Region, Queensland, Australia.

History 
The locality takes its name from the pastoral run name, which was named by pastoralist Charles Mallard  in the early 1840s after his English birthplace.

Felton South State School opened in 1929 and closed circa 1952.

References 

Toowoomba Region
Localities in Queensland